Khokhol-Trostyanka is a rural locality (a selo) and the administrative center of Khokhol-Trostyanskoye Rural Settlement, Ostrogozhsky District, Voronezh Oblast, Russia. The population was 652 as of 2010. There are 7 streets.

Geography 
Khokhol-Trostyanka is located 27 km southwest of Ostrogozhsk (the district's administrative centre) by road. Repenka is the nearest rural locality.

References 

Rural localities in Ostrogozhsky District